Meda of Odessos, died 336 BC, was a Thracian princess, daughter of the king Cothelas a Getae,  and wife of king Philip II of Macedon. Philip married her after Olympias.

According to N. G. L. Hammond, when Philip died, Meda committed suicide so that she would follow Philip to Hades. The people of Macedonia, who were not used to such honours to their kings by their consorts, buried her with him at the Great Tumuli of Vergina, in a separate room. The second larnax found in the tomb might belong to her as well as the gold myrtle wreath.

Honours
Meda Nunatak in Antarctica is named after Meda of Odessos.

See also

Museum of the Royal Tombs of Aigai (Vergina)

References

Sources
 Women and monarchy in Macedonia by Elizabeth Donnelly Carney, p. 68; p. 236-237 

336 BC deaths
Ancient Macedonian queens consort
Thracian women
Wives of Philip II of Macedon
Ancient Macedonians who committed suicide
Getae
Dacians
Year of birth unknown
Ancient princesses